Trichodiadema is a genus of succulent plants of the family Aizoaceae.

The name "Trichodiadema" comes from the ancient Greek "τρῐχός" (hair, bristle) and "διαδεμα" (crown).

They come from Cape Province in South Africa.

Description 
Trichodiadema are small, short-stemmed succulents with small, elongated, alternating sections measuring 8 mm long. They are grey and green.

At the apex of each alternating section is a ring of small bristles radiating around the center, that give the appearance of a cactus areola.

The flowers look like daisies, with red, pink or white petals, earning them the nickname "Desert Rose". 
Two species however, Trichodiadema aureum and Trichodiadema introrsum, have flowers that are yellow.

Cultivation 
The plant requires sun exposure (although not too intense), and well-drained soil.

Propagation is by division of the clumps. Propagation by cuttings is difficult, because of the risk of rot.

Trichodiademum densum has gained the Royal Horticultural Society's Award of Garden Merit.

List of species

References

External links

 
Aizoaceae genera